In Greek mythology, Cytus (Ancient Greek: Κύτον Kytos) was the son of the Rhodian nymph Himalia and Zeus. He was the brother of Cronius and Spartaeus.

Mythology 
When Cytus and his brothers were still young men, Aphrodite travelling from Cythera to Cyprus, dropped near Rhodes but was prevented by the sons of Poseidon and Halia. Thus, the goddess cursed them with insanity.

Notes

References 

 Diodorus Siculus, The Library of History translated by Charles Henry Oldfather. Twelve volumes. Loeb Classical Library. Cambridge, Massachusetts: Harvard University Press; London: William Heinemann, Ltd. 1989. Vol. 3. Books 4.59–8. Online version at Bill Thayer's Web Site
 Diodorus Siculus, Bibliotheca Historica. Vol 1-2. Immanel Bekker. Ludwig Dindorf. Friedrich Vogel. in aedibus B. G. Teubneri. Leipzig. 1888–1890. Greek text available at the Perseus Digital Library.

Children of Zeus
Demigods in classical mythology
Rhodian characters in Greek mythology